Wangcha Rajkumar (29 December 1966 - 23 December 2007) was an Indian politician and former Member of Parliament, Lok Sabha representing Arunachal Pradesh East from 1996 to 2004. He was assassinated by unidentified assailants of on 23 December 2007.

Personal life
Rajkumar was born on 29 December 1966 to Wangmai Rajkumar and Chamcha Rajkumar Namsang tehsil of the Tirap district of Arunachal Pradesh. He was educated at Ramakrishna Mission in Deomali. Rajkumar married Secha Rajkumar on 22 April 1992, with whom he had a son.

Political career
As a member of the Indian National Congress party, Rajkumar was the Joint Secretary of the Indian Youth Congress from 1987 to 1990 and the District Congress from 1990 to 1994. He became a Member of the Arunachal Pradesh Legislative Assembly in 1995.

Subsequently he was elected as the Member of Parliament in the 11th, 12th, and 13th Lok Sabha as a representative of the Arunachal Pradesh East constituency from 1996 to 2004. During his tenure, Rajkumar was a member of the Public Accounts Committee; Committee on Government Assurances; Committee on Food, Civil Supplies and Public Distribution; Consultative Committee, Ministry of Power; Rules Committee; and Consultative Committee, Ministry of Home Affairs.

Death
Rajkumar was shot dead by two unidentified assailants on 23 December 2007 at Deomali Community Hall while playing badminton. In 2011, the Central Bureau Of Investigation revealed that members of separatist group National Socialist Council of Nagaland were involved in the assassination and had arrested a member in the process. However the case is still pending as of June 2019.

References

1966 births
2007 deaths
India MPs 1999–2004
India MPs 1998–1999
India MPs 1996–1997
Lok Sabha members from Arunachal Pradesh
People from Tirap district
Indian National Congress politicians
Arunachal Congress politicians
Assassinated Indian politicians